James Campbell (4 November 1901 – 2 July 1975) was a British athlete. He competed in the men's pole vault at the 1924 Summer Olympics.

References

External links
 

1901 births
1975 deaths
Athletes (track and field) at the 1924 Summer Olympics
British male pole vaulters
Olympic athletes of Great Britain
Place of birth missing